Ronald Hunte (born 5 November 1883, date of death unknown) was a Guyanese cricketer. He played in twelve first-class matches for British Guiana from 1908 to 1930.

See also
 List of Guyanese representative cricketers

References

External links
 

1883 births
Year of death missing
Guyanese cricketers
Guyana cricketers